The Kansas Jayhawks men's basketball program is the intercollegiate men's basketball program of the University of Kansas. The program is classified in the NCAA's Division I and the team competes in the Big 12 Conference. Kansas is considered one of the most prestigious college basketball programs in the country with six overall national championships (4 NCAA Tournament championships and 2 Helms national championships), as well being runner-up six times and having the most conference titles in the nation. Kansas is the all-time consecutive conference titles record holder with 14 consecutive outright or shared titles, a streak that ran from 2005 through 2018. The Jayhawks also own the NCAA record for most consecutive NCAA Tournament appearances with an active streak of 32 consecutive appearances. They were also, along with Dartmouth, the first team to appear in multiple NCAA Tournaments after making their second appearance in the 1942 tournament. The Jayhawks had been ranked in the AP poll for 231 consecutive polls, a streak that had stretched from the poll released on February 2, 2009 poll through the poll released on February 8, 2021, which is the longest streak in AP poll history. Of the 24 seasons the Big 12 conference has been in existence, Kansas has won at least a share of 19 regular-season conference titles.

The Jayhawks' first coach was the inventor of basketball, James Naismith. Naismith, ironically, is the only coach in Kansas basketball history with a losing record. The Kansas basketball program has produced many notable professional players, including Clyde Lovellette, Wilt Chamberlain, Jo Jo White, Danny Manning, Raef LaFrentz, Paul Pierce, Nick Collison, Kirk Hinrich, Mario Chalmers, Andrew Wiggins, and Joel Embiid. Politician Bob Dole also played basketball at Kansas. Former players that have gone on to be coaches include Phog Allen, Adolph Rupp, Dean Smith, Dutch Lonborg, and former assistants to go on to be notable coaches include John Calipari, Gregg Popovich, and Bill Self. Mark Turgeon, Jerod Haase, Danny Manning, and Tad Boyle are all former players and assistant coaches that became head coaches. Allen founded the National Association of Basketball Coaches and, with Lonborg, was an early proponent of the NCAA tournament. Four different Jayhawk head coaches are in the Naismith Memorial Basketball Hall of Fame as coaches, Phog Allen, Larry Brown, Roy Williams, and current head coach Bill Self. Three different Division I basketball arenas have been named after former Kansas players, the Dean Smith Center named after Dean Smith at North Carolina, Rupp Arena named after Adolph Rupp at Kentucky, and the Jayhawks’ own arena Allen Fieldhouse named after Phog Allen.

In 2008, ESPN ranked Kansas second on a list of the most prestigious programs of the modern college basketball era. Kansas currently has the longest streak of consecutive NCAA tournament appearances of all-time (32), the longest current streak of consecutive NCAA winning seasons (39), the most winning seasons in Division I history (104), the most non-losing seasons (.500 or better) in NCAA history (106), the most conference championships in Division I history (63), the most consecutive regular-season conference titles in Division I (14), the most First-Team All-Americans in Division I history (24), and the most First-Team All-American selections in Division I history (31). As of the last complete season, the program ranks third in Division I all-time winning percentage (.723) and first in Division I all-time wins (2,357).

Since the opening of Allen Fieldhouse, the Jayhawks’ home arena, in 1955, the Jayhawks have earned a well established home court advantage. Allen Fieldhouse is often considered one of the best home court advantages in college basketball. As of 2022, the Jayhawks have won over 87 percent of their games in the 67-year history of Allen Fieldhouse, losing just 110 games. Under current head coach Bill Self, the Jayhawks have had three home court winning streaks over 30 games and two over 50 games. In addition to Allen Fieldhouse, the Jayhawks frequently play games at the nearby T-Mobile Center (formerly Sprint Center) in Kansas City, Missouri. These games, while technically a neutral site, are officially considered home games when not part of a tournament, the only exception being their games at the arena during their six-game series with rival Missouri.

History

Kansas ranks first all-time in NCAA Division I wins with 2,357 wins (as of the last complete season), against 877 losses (.729 all time winning %, third all-time). This record includes a 765–110 (.874) mark at historic Allen Fieldhouse. The Jayhawks are first in NCAA history with 98 winning seasons, and tied for first in NCAA history with 101 non-losing (.500 or better) seasons with Kentucky. Kansas is tied for the fewest head coaches (8) of any program that has played since the 19th century, yet has reached the Final Four under more head coaches (6) than any other program in the nation. Every head coach at Kansas since the inception of the NCAA Tournament has led the program to the Final Four. Kansas has had four head coaches inducted into the Naismith Hall of Fame, more than any other program in the nation. A perennial conference powerhouse, Kansas leads Division I all-time in regular season conference titles with 62 in 113 years of conference play (the MVIAA Conference was created in 1907) through the 2019–20 regular season. The Jayhawks have won a record 20 conference titles and a record 11 conference tournament titles in the 24 years of the Big 12's existence. The program also owns the best Big 12 records in both those areas with a 412–102 record in conference play and a 46–12 record in tournament play. The Jayhawks won their 2,000th game in school history when they defeated Texas Tech in the 2009–2010 season, joining the University of Kentucky and the University of North Carolina as the only schools to boast such an achievement at that time.

James Naismith era (1898–1907)

The men's basketball program officially began in 1898, following the arrival of Dr. James Naismith to the school, just six years after Naismith had written the sport's first official rules. Naismith was initially hired to be a chapel director and physical education instructor, but became the head basketball coach.

The Jayhawks played their first game on February 3, 1899 against the Kansas City YMCA, a game they lost 5–16. They would win their first game a week later on February 10 in a 31–6 victory over the Topeka YMCA. Their first intercollegiate game was played on March 23 against Haskell, a school about two miles southeast of the southeastern edge of the University of Kansas. They would finish their first season 7–4.

During the programs early years, the majority of the university's basketball games were played against nearby YMCA teams, with YMCAs across the nation having played an integral part in the birth of basketball. Other common opponents were Haskell and William Jewell. Under Naismith, the team began their rivalries with Kansas State, later deemed the Sunflower Showdown and Missouri, later deemed the Border War (officially changed to Border Showdown in 2004). Naismith was, ironically, the only coach in the program's history to have a losing record (55–60).

Including his years as coach, Naismith served as the Athletic Director and a faculty member at Kansas for a total of almost 40 years before retiring in 1937. Naismith died in 1939, and his remains are buried in Lawrence, Kansas. The basketball court in Allen Fieldhouse is named James Naismith Court. Beyond inventing the game, his next greatest basketball legacy may be his coaching tree, whose two trunks are the well-known Phog Allen and Kansas native John McLendon. (McLendon attended KU in the 1930s when Allen was head coach.  Although McLendon tried out for the team, he never played for Allen. Naismith mentored McLendon from his arrival at Kansas through degree completion and beyond.)

On December 10, 2010, the David Booth family purchased Dr. James Naismith's 13 Original Rules of the game at a Sotheby's auction in New York City for the sum of $4.3 million. They brought the founding document of basketball back to KU's Lawrence campus, where it is currently housed at the DeBruce Center.

Phog Allen/William O. Hamilton era (1907–1956)
In 1907, Kansas hired one of Naismith's players, Dr. Forrest C. "Phog" Allen as head coach. Naismith provided Allen with a now infamous piece of wisdom: "You can't coach basketball; you just play it." Allen would set out to prove the adage wrong and through success and an unrivaled coaching tree has become known as the "Father of Basketball Coaching", having passed on his knowledge of the game to some of the most well-respected names in the history of college basketball, including National Basketball Hall of Fame coaches Adolph Rupp, Dean Smith, Dutch Lonborg and Ralph Miller (all except Lonborg were born and raised in Kansas). Allen coached the team from 1907 to 1909, but William O. Hamilton coached from 1909 to 1919, with Allen taking over again in 1919. The team went 125–59 and won five conference championships under Hamilton's direction.

Allen coached KU for 39 seasons and amassed a record of 590–219, with two retroactively-awarded Helms Foundation national titles and one NCAA Tournament championship in 1952. Numerous basketball greats would play at Kansas during Allen's era, including Dean Smith, Adolph Rupp, Dutch Lonborg, and Ralph Miller (all future Hall of Fame coaches), Paul Endacott, Bill Johnson, and Clyde Lovellette (Hall of Fame players), two-time Olympic Gold Medalist Bill Hougland, and even former United States Senate Majority Leader Bob Dole.

In 1952, the Jayhawks won the national title with an 80–63 victory in the final game over St. John's, coached by Frank McGuire. Clyde Lovellette of Kansas was named the tournament's Most Outstanding Player, and is still the only player to lead the nation in scoring and lead his team to a national title in the same year. This tournament was the first to have a true "Final Four" format. Seven members of the championship team represented the United States in the 1952 Summer Olympics and brought home a gold medal for the national basketball team. This was especially poignant for Allen, as he had been the driving force for having basketball added to the Olympics in 1936.
Allen was forced to retire when he turned 70 in 1956, because he was getting too "old". Allen had recruited legendary Wilt Chamberlain to Kansas, but would not get to coach him because freshmen were not eligible to play varsity basketball in 1956.

Dick Harp era (1956–1964)

Following Allen's retirement, the Jayhawks hired former KU player and assistant, Dick Harp. Under Harp the Jayhawks went 121–82 with two conference titles and two NCAA tournament berths.

Wilt Chamberlain played his varsity years under Harp, making his job a rather easy one for the first two seasons. In his first varsity game, Chamberlain scored 52 points and grabbed 31 rebounds, breaking both all-time college records in an 87–69 win against Northwestern. In 1957, he led the Jayhawks to the championship game against North Carolina, coached by Frank McGuire, whom they had defeated in the 1952 title game when McGuire was at St. John's. McGuire triple-teamed Chamberlain and, as a result, KU was defeated 54–53 in triple overtime. The game is considered one of the greatest in NCAA history. Chamberlain continued to average 30+ points per game until leaving KU early to play professionally with the Harlem Globetrotters.

Ted Owens era (1964–1983)
Ted Owens took over for Harp in 1964, and would go 348–128 during his tenure, eventually winning six Big Eight Conference titles.

The team advanced to NCAA postseason play seven times under Owens. The 1971 team went 27–3 and advanced to the Final Four before losing to UCLA. In 1974 the team went 23–7 and again advanced to the Final Four before losing to Marquette.

During this era the program produced All-Americans such as Jo Jo White, Walt Wesley, Bud Stallworth, Darnell Valentine, and Dave Robisch.

After 19 years of coaching at University of Kansas, Owens was fired following the 1982–83 season after the Jayhawks posted back-to-back losing seasons.

Larry Brown era (1983–1988)

In 1983, Larry Brown headed to the University of Kansas, after coaching in the NBA. Under Brown, Kansas finished first in the Big Eight in 1986, and second in 1984, 1985, and 1987. In 1988, Kansas got off to a 12–8 start, including 1–4 in the Big 8.  The Jayhawks' 55-game homecourt winning streak in Allen Fieldhouse was snapped with a loss to rival Kansas State, and they would also lose two more home games to Duke and Oklahoma. Behind the high-scoring of Danny Manning, KU finished 21–11 at the end of the season and entered the NCAA tournament as a #6 seed. Two early upsets allowed them to face lower seeds, gain momentum, and advance.  The Jayhawks would ultimately go on to face the three teams who had given them their three home losses that season.  They defeated rival Kansas State in the Elite 8, then defeated Duke in the Final 4, and won the national championship, defeating favored conference rival Oklahoma 83–79 in the final. The 11 losses Kansas accrued in 1988 are more than any other national champion have before or since. The win garnered the team the nickname "Danny and the Miracles". Earlier, near the start of the tournament, Dick Vitale had been asked about Kansas' chances and commented "If Kansas wins, I'll kiss the Jayhawk on the floor of Allen Fieldhouse." Eventually, he did make good on his promise.

During Brown's tenure, Kansas had five NCAA Tournament appearances, which included two second round appearances, one Sweet 16 appearance, two trips to the Final Four and the national championship. He also compiled a 135–44 (.754) overall record. Brown left under a cloud, as NCAA sanctions and a postseason probation were levied against Kansas following Brown's departure in the 1988–1989 season as a result of recruiting violations that took place during Brown's tenure. The major violation was a plane ticket home for potential transfer Vincent Askew to see his sick grandmother. Prior to the investigation, Askew had already decided not to transfer to Kansas.

Roy Williams era (1988–2003)
Shortly following Brown's departure, Kansas hired then North Carolina assistant Roy Williams as head coach.

From 1988 to 2003, under the direction of Williams, the Jayhawks had a record of 418–101, a .805 winning percentage. Williams' Kansas teams averaged 27.8 wins per season. Except for his first season at Kansas (when the team was on probation), all of Williams' teams made the NCAA tournament. On Roy's first KU team Patrick Richey, Adonis Jordan and Richard Scott could not visit campus because of recruiting violations by Larry Brown, so they committed sight unseen. From 1990 to 1999 Kansas compiled a 286–60 record, giving them both the most wins and best winning percentage of any team in that decade. From 1994 to 1998, the Jayhawks won 62 consecutive home games at Allen Fieldhouse, which was the longest such streak in the NCAA at the time. The seniors of 1998 (Raef LaFrentz, Billy Thomas, and C.B. McGrath) went 58–0 at home during their KU careers.

Kansas won nine regular-season conference championships over Williams' last 13 years. In seven years of Big 12 Conference play, his teams went 94–18, capturing the regular-season title in 1997, 1998, 2002 and 2003 and the postseason tournament crown in 1997, 1998 and 1999. In 2001–02, KU became the first, and so far only, team to go undefeated (16–0) in Big 12 play. From 1995 to 1998, Kansas was a combined 123–17 – an average of 30.8 wins per season.
Williams' teams went 201–17 (.922) in Allen Fieldhouse, and won 62 consecutive games in Allen from February 1994 to December 1998. Kansas was a regular in the Associated Press Top 25 from 1991 to 1999, placing in the poll for 145 consecutive weeks. Williams' teams were ranked in the Top 10 in 194 AP polls from 1990.

Kansas led the nation in field goal percentage and scoring in 2002 and in scoring margin in 2003, held opponents to the lowest field goal percentage in the country in 2001 (37.8 percent), and led the nation in winning percentage in 1997 and 2002. The team shot better than 50 percent from the floor for seven different seasons under Williams, and led the country in field goal percentage in 1990 (53.3) and 2002 (50.6). Williams' teams shot a combined 49.4 percent from the floor during his tenure. Williams-coached teams led the nation in assists in 2001 and 2002 and were seventh in the nation in 2003; scored 100 or more points 71 times (once every 13 games); averaged 82.7 points per game over his 15 seasons as coach; and averaged 90 or more points per game in two seasons (92.1 in 1990 and 90.9 in 2002).

The Jayhawks were in the AP Top 25 in 242 of 268 weekly polls, reached the No. 1 ranking in the country in six different seasons, and reached at least No. 2 in the nation in 11 of William's 15 seasons as head coach at Kansas.

Under Williams, the team had several deep runs in the NCAA Tournament, making it to four Final Fours and appearing in the national championship game in both 1991 and 2003, losing both, to Duke and Syracuse respectively. Amidst the tournament successes, there were plenty of woes. The 1996–97 team was said by many to be one of the greatest teams in history, featuring future NBA players such as Paul Pierce, Jacque Vaughn, Raef LaFrentz, Greg Orstertag, and Scot Pollard. The team was upset in the Sweet Sixteen by the eventual champion, Arizona Wildcats.

The Jayhawks advanced to the Final Four in 2002 & 2003. Following the national championship loss in 2003, Williams left Kansas and returned to coach at his alma mater, North Carolina.

Bill Self era (2003–present)
Bill Self was introduced as the new head coach for the 2003–04 season and in his first season at Kansas, Self inherited Williams' players and recruits, which often caused turmoil as the style of play differed between the two coaches. Nevertheless, Self led his new Kansas team to the Elite Eight at the NCAA tournament his first year.

KU in 2004–05 was led by seniors Wayne Simien, Keith Langford, Michael Lee, and Aaron Miles. They began the season ranked #1 and started off 20–1, but then they slumped and lost six of their final nine games, including a loss to Bucknell in the first round of the NCAA Tournament. The team finished 23–7 and settled for a Big 12 co-championship with Oklahoma.

In 2005–06, little was expected of the freshman/sophomore-dominated Jayhawks, and they began the season 10–6, including 1–2 in the Big 12. Although they did post a 73–46 win over Kentucky, they also saw the end of their 31-game winning streak over rival Kansas State with a 59–55 loss at Allen Fieldhouse, and two nights later blew a seven-point lead in the final 45 seconds of regulation en route to an 89–86 overtime loss at Missouri. But afterward, the Jayhawks matured rapidly, winning 15 of their final 17 games and avenging the losses to both Kansas State and Missouri. KU played as the #2 seed in the Big 12 Tournament in Dallas, and avenged an earlier loss to Texas with an 80–68 victory over the Longhorns in the final to clinch the tournament championship and the highlight win of the season. KU was handed a #4 seed for the NCAA Tournament but stumbled again in the first round with a loss to the Bradley Braves.

In the 2006–07 season, Self led Kansas to the 2007 Big 12 regular-season championship with a 14–2 record, highlighted by beating the Kevin Durant-led Texas Longhorns in come-from-behind victories in the last game of the regular season and in the Big 12 Championship game. At the end of the regular season, Kansas stood at 27–4 and ranked #2 in the nation in both the AP and coaches' polls. Kansas received a number 1 seed in the NCAA tournament, but their tournament run ended in the Elite Eight with a loss to 2-seed UCLA.

In the 2007–08 season, Self's Kansas team began the season 20–0 until they suffered their first loss at rival Kansas State, their first loss at Kansas State since 1983. The 2008 Jayhawks won the Big 12 regular-season title and the Big 12 conference tourney. They received a number-one seeding in the NCAA tournament in the Midwest region. On March 30, 2008, Self led Kansas to a win in an Elite Eight game over upstart Davidson College. KU won by two, 59–57. The Jayhawks played overall number 1 tournament seed North Carolina in the semifinals, a team coached by former KU head man Roy Williams.  The Jayhawks opened the game with a 40–12 run over the first 12½ minutes before finally defeating them 84–66.  On April 7, 2008, the Jayhawks triumphed over a one-loss Memphis team to claim the national title.  With only seconds on the clock, Sherron Collins drove the ball the length of the court and threaded a pass to Mario Chalmers, who connected on a deep three-pointer to force overtime. This shot would later come to be known as "Mario's Miracle" in a nod to 1988 championship nickname "Danny and the Miracles".  Kansas then outplayed Memphis in the overtime to win the NCAA Championship game, 75–68.  The Jayhawks finished the season with a 37–3 record, the winningest season in Kansas history.

In the 2008–09 season, despite losing seven of their top nine scorers and the entire starting line-up, the Jayhawks earned their 20th consecutive NCAA tournament bid after going 25–7 (14–2), winning the conference regular season title and extending their home winning streak to 41 straight at Allen Fieldhouse. On March 22, 2009, Kansas defeated Dayton, advancing to their 3rd consecutive Sweet 16 appearance. But the Jayhawks' season ended on March 27 when Michigan State came from behind in the final minute to defeat Kansas 67–62, ending their year at 27–8. Coach Self's record, after 6 seasons with the Jayhawks, was 169–40, an .809 percentage. After the season, Self was named National Coach of the Year by the Associated Press, CBS Sports' Chevrolet Award, USBWA (Henry Iba Award), and Sporting News.

On April 13, Sherron Collins and Cole Aldrich announced their intent to return for the 2009–10 season. On April 23, top high school recruit Xavier Henry made his commitment to play at Kansas in the fall, prompting ESPN to name the Jayhawks as "the team to beat in 2009–10."  By the time the fall of 2009 arrived, Kansas was the unanimous preseason #1 team in all major publications. The Jayhawks finished the regular season with a 29–2 record and continue to hold the Division I record for the current consecutive home winning streak at 59 straight games in Allen Fieldhouse.  Kansas passed 2,000 all-time wins in the 2009–10 season, only the third school to do so (finishing the season with a total of 2,003 all-time victories). They won the Big 12 tournament on March 13, clinching their 21st consecutive NCAA tournament appearance, an active NCAA record. However, despite being named the overall #1 seed in the tournament, the Jayhawks fell in the second round to #9-seeded Northern Iowa, finishing the season at 33–3.

Recruiting began immediately for the 2010–11 season, as Kansas landed the nation's top recruit Josh Selby in April.  By September 2010, both The Sporting News and Athlon Sports had ranked Kansas in their pre-season outlook as #4 overall and, along with ESPN's Joe Lunardi, were projected to become a #1 seed again in the 2011 NCAA Tournament, which they would again earn.  Blue Ribbon and the USA Today/ESPN coaches polls both placed Kansas at #7 in the pre-season poll. Josh Selby, became eligible and joined the Jayhawk line-up on December 18. On March 5, the Jayhawks beat Missouri 70–66 to clinch the Big 12 regular-season title for the 7th consecutive time and later went on to finish 29–2 during the regular season, ranked #2 in both the AP Poll and the USA Today/ESPN Coaches Poll. Bill Self was named Big 12 Coach of the Year and Marcus Morris was named Big 12 Player of the Year.  The Jayhawks defeated 16 seed Boston University, 9 seed Illinois and 12 seed Richmond to reach their 3rd Elite Eight in the past 5 seasons before falling to 11 seed Virginia Commonwealth University in the quarterfinal game. During the season, Kansas moved past North Carolina as the 2nd winningest basketball program in history.

After being considered the top team but falling short in both of the previous two seasons, Kansas lost six of their top 8 scorers for the 2011–12 season. The Jayhawks had to rebuild after winning seven straight Big 12 titles. Prior to the season, the NCAA declared that three of the Jayhawks top recruits were ineligible for the season, which included games against perennial powerhouse programs such as Kentucky, Duke, Ohio State, and Georgetown. Despite 7 games against top 10 ranked opponents, Kansas finished the regular season 26–5, earned their 8th consecutive Big 12 title, and advanced to their 14th Final Four in school history. The Jayhawks faced another 2 seed, the Ohio State Buckeyes, in the National Semifinals, and came back from a 13-point first-half deficit to win the game, 64–62. They then faced the Kentucky Wildcats, who had beaten the Louisville Cardinals on the other side of the bracket, in the championship game. Kansas lost to the Wildcats, 67–59.

Kansas entered the 2012–13 season with eight straight Big 12 titles in tow. They ended the season having won 107 of their last 109 games at home.  After scoring their ninth consecutive title and winning the Big 12 tournament championship by defeating rival Kansas State for the third time that season, KU set its sights on a sixth national title.  They were seeded #1 in the South bracket, defeating Western Kentucky and North Carolina before losing in overtime to Michigan 87–85 in the Sweet 16.

With star freshmen Andrew Wiggins and Joel Embiid on the roster, Kansas entered the 2013–14 season as the #5 team in the country. They started off well with five straight wins, including a victory over Duke in the Champions' Classic. However, the team went 4–4 over its next eight games, including back-to-back losses to Colorado and Florida and an ugly home loss to San Diego State. The team recovered from this rough stretch and began Big 12 play with seven straight wins, ultimately finishing 14–4 to win its 10th consecutive Big 12 title. A back injury to Joel Embiid, however, left the Jayhawks vulnerable on their interior defense, and they fizzled out at season's end with four losses in their final seven games, including a loss to Iowa State in the Big 12 Tournament quarterfinals in Kansas City and an NCAA Tournament Round of 32 loss to Stanford to end the year. Kansas concluded the year 25–10, the first ten-loss season for Kansas since Roy Williams' 1999–2000 Jayhawks went 24–10.

After the exodus of Andrew Wiggins and Joel Embiid to the NBA draft, the Jayhawks reloaded with freshmen Kelly Oubre Jr. and Cliff Alexander, the Jayhawks looked poised for another Big 12 season title, which would be their 11th straight. After a loss in the Champions Classic to Kentucky, the Jayhawks finished 11–2 in the non-conference. In what many regarded as the toughest conference in the nation (Big 12) the Jayhawks won their 11th straight title outright with a record of 13–5, having lost a strong post presence in Cliff Alexander due to an investigation by the NCAA of improper benefits being given to Alexander. Evidence never clearly materialized, but Alexander was held out and played his last game as a Jayhawk at Kansas State, where they lost by 7. They then lost in the Big 12 Championship game to Iowa State 70–66, and had a final record going into the tournament of 26–8. The Jayhawks were given a 2 seed in the NCAA Tournament, where they ousted 15 seed New Mexico State by 19 points, but exited the tournament early at the hands of Wichita State by 13 points. Both Oubre Jr. and Alexander declared for the draft shortly after the conclusion of the NCAA tournament.

The 2015–16 Jayhawks, led by Perry Ellis and Frank Mason, won a 12th consecutive Big 12 title and won the Big 12 Tournament. Seeded #1 in the NCAA South Region, the Jayhawks reached the Elite Eight, where they stumbled against #2 seed Villanova, the eventual national champions.

In 2016–17, behind the leadership of national player of the year Frank Mason, the Jayhawks won a 13th consecutive Big 12 title, tying UCLA's record for most consecutive conference titles. Although the team made an early exit from the Big 12 Tournament with a quarterfinal loss to TCU, the Jayhawks got the #1 seed in the NCAA Midwest Region. They dominated UC-Davis, Michigan State, and Purdue in their first three games, but ran into a buzzsaw against Oregon in the Elite Eight.

The 2017–18 Jayhawks lost a number of players to graduation, the NBA Draft, and transfer; but appeared to be poised for another spectacular season. Star freshman Billy Preston was sidelined by an NCAA inquiry into the financial picture surrounding his car, and ultimately left the team to play professional basketball in Europe. Kansas won its first seven games before losing in Kansas City to Washington and at home to Arizona State. Kansas would lose a total of three home games during the season, the most for any Bill Self-coached Kansas team, and the most since losing three home games in the 1998–99 season. The season bottomed out in early February with a home loss to Oklahoma State and a 16-point loss at Baylor. But Kansas rallied to win a 14th straight Big 12 title, breaking UCLA's record. Then they defeated West Virginia to win the Big 12 Tournament. Seeded #1 in the NCAA Midwest Region, the Jayhawks defeated Penn, Seton Hall, Clemson, and Duke to reach Bill Self's third Final Four appearance and the program's 15th overall. However, they stumbled against Villanova for the second time in three years. As with their last outing, Villanova wound up as the college champions.

Kansas played in the 2015 World University Games in South Korea as the United States representatives in July 2015. The Jayhawks went undefeated in the World University Games, winning the championship to give the United States its first gold medal in World University Games men's basketball since 2005. In August 2017, Self and the Jayhawks traveled to Italy to play four exhibition matches against local professional Italian teams.

Shortly before the 2019–20 season began the NCAA announced they had major NCAA violations stemming from their involvement in the 2017–18 NCAA Division I men's basketball corruption scandal putting their NCAA record consecutive tournament appearance streak in jeopardy.

The Jayhawks finished the 2019–20 regular season 28–3 and were unanimously ranked number one in the final regular season AP poll. The Jayhawks went undefeated against unranked teams, and their three losses came to ranked teams. The Jayhawks were a favorite to win the NCAA Tournament, but the tournament was cancelled on March 12, 2020, due to the COVID-19 pandemic.

The following season, the Jayhawks struggled early in the conference schedule. After eight games, they had a 4–4 conference record. At one point during conference play, they lost five of seven games which included a 3-game losing streak, a rarity under Self. They would finish the regular season the season winning seven of their last eight games, including a 71–58 defeat of number 2 ranked Baylor, who was undefeated going into the game. Kansas withdrew from the Big 12 tournament after a player tested positive for COVID-19. They qualified for the tournament, extending their NCAA record to 31 consecutive tournaments. They defeated Eastern Washington in the first round. The following round, they were beaten by USC 51–85, their worst NCAA Tournament loss in school history and one of the worst defeats in program history.

On April 2, 2021, Kansas signed Self to a lifetime contract. The contract will automatically add an extra year to every year he coaches until he retires or dies.

The 2021–22 team earned a number 1 seed in the 2022 NCAA tournament. They defeated Providence in the tournament to become the winningest program in the nation. They defeated Villanova in the Final Four. The Jayhawks defeated North Carolina 72-69 in the National Championship game to win Self's second championship, and the team's fourth NCAA championship. In the championship game, they completed a 16-point comeback, including being down 40-25 at halftime, the largest in NCAA championship history.

Conference affiliations
Kansas has been affiliated with the following conferences:

Rank in notable areas
* Active streak.Current Official NCAA Records and Awards data.

Notable games
 On February 3, 1899, the Jayhawks, coached by James Naismith played their first game in program history. They played the Kansas City YMCA in a game the Jayhawks lost 5–16.
 The first victory in program history came on February 10, 1899. The Jayhawks defeated the Topeka YMCA 31–6.
 On January 25, 1907, the Jayhawks played Kansas State for the first time beginning the rivalry that would become known as the Sunflower Showdown, a nod to the state flower of Kansas and one of the state's nicknames, the Sunflower State. The Jayhawks won 54–49.
 The Jayhawks bitter rivalry with Missouri began on March 11, 1907, a game the Jayhawks lost 31–34. The rivalry would eventually become known as the Border War.
 On March 22, 1940, the Jayhawks played their first ever NCAA Tournament game. They defeated Rice 50–44 in Municipal Auditorium in Kansas City, Missouri. The Jayhawks would defeat USC the following day to make their first National Championship game appearance, but lost to Indiana 42–60.
 In the NCAA title game in 1957, Wilt Chamberlain and Kansas were defeated by the North Carolina Tar Heels 54–53 in triple overtime in what many consider to be the greatest NCAA Championship game ever played. Chamberlain was later named the NCAA Final Four Most Outstanding Player, the second to win the award and be a part of the losing team (Kansas’ B.H. Born won the award in 1953).
 In the 1966 Midwest Regional Finals, Kansas, the favored team to face Kentucky, played Texas Western. Texas Western got a controversial double overtime victory, 81–80. The would-be winning shot, a 35-footer, at the buzzer was made by All-American Jo Jo White at the end of the first overtime, but White was called for stepping on the sideline, ironically being penalized for being too far away from the basket and the shot was negated.  This has always been highly contested and a photograph of the play shows his heel over the line but not on the floor.  Being the only piece of impartial evidence, it is impossible to tell whether his heel came up from the line prior to the photo, or whether his heel dropped to the line following the photo.  Also noted in the photograph is the fact that the referee is not looking at his foot.  This supports Ted Owens' objection that the call was made late, if the ref did not see his foot until after the shot.  The Kansas players were celebrating when they were told the game was going to a 2nd overtime. Regardless of what actually happened, Texas Western was given the victory and advanced to the Final Four.  The game is immortalized in the 2006 film Glory Road which is based on that season's Texas Western team.
 On February 26, 1972, near the end of a 11–15 season for the Jayhawks, senior forward Bud Stallworth scored 50 points against archrival Missouri, who were in the running for the Big 8 Conference championship.  Behind Stallworth's mammoth effort, the second-highest number of points in a game in KU history (Wilt Chamberlain scored 52 in his first game as a Jayhawk), KU defeated Missouri 93–80 on Senior Day at Allen Fieldhouse.  Stallworth averaged 25.3 points per game for the 1971–72 season.
 On April 4, 1988, in the 50th NCAA Tournament National Championship game, Kansas defeated the heavily favored Oklahoma Sooners 83–79 to win its second NCAA Men's Basketball championship. Led by senior forward and Player of the Year Danny Manning, Kevin Pritchard, Milt Newton, Chris Piper and a roster of players who came to be known as "The Miracles" raced the Sooners to a 50–50 halftime tie that had the referees shaking their heads and smiling as they left the court.  Upon their return for the second half, Larry Brown convinced his Jayhawks that now that they proved they could run with the Sooners, they needed to slow the game down and take the Sooners out of their fast break offense.  The Sooners built a 5-point second half lead until the Kansas defense finally clamped down.  The Jayhawks, led by Manning (31 points, 18 rebounds, 5 steals, 2 blocked shots), caught up with them around the 11 minute mark.  The rest of the game was neck and neck, until Manning finally sealed the victory from the free throw line.
 On December 9, 1989, AP #2 Kansas beat Kentucky 150–95 in Allen Fieldhouse. The 150 points scored by the Jayhawks set the school record for most points scored in a game, and the team's 80 first-half points set the record for most points scored in a half.
 On January 27, 2003, Kansas defeated Big 12 Conference Texas 90–87 at Allen Fieldhouse behind a 24-point, 23-rebound performance by Nick Collison.  Upon Collison fouling out of the game, his effort moved longtime ESPN college basketball analyst Dick Vitale to give him a standing ovation, only the second time Vitale had ever done so. (the first being for David Robinson)  Both Kansas and Texas would make the Final Four that year.
 On April 7, 2008, in one of the most memorable NCAA National Championship games ever, the Kansas Jayhawks defeated the Memphis Tigers 75–68 in a come from behind overtime victory to become the 2008 NCAA Division I men's basketball tournament Champions. Mario Chalmers made a three-point shot with 2.1 seconds remaining, bringing the Jayhawks all the way back from a 60–51 deficit with two minutes remaining. The Jayhawks went 4–4 from the field, including 2–2 from 3-point range, and also went 2–2 from the line in the final 2 minutes.  The Jayhawks then continued their hot flurry by going 4–6 from the field in OT and 4–4 from the line, outscoring the Tigers 12–5 in overtime to capture their third NCAA title, and fifth overall, including the retroactively awarded Helms Foundation Championships for the 1922 and 1923 seasons. Chalmers finished with 18 points, 3 rebounds, 3 assists, and 4 steals, and was chosen the Most Outstanding Player at the Final Four, the fifth Jayhawk all-time to be selected Final Four MOP.
 On January 15, 2011, Kansas celebrated its 69th consecutive home win (over Nebraska), the longest such Division I record since 1992 and the longest home winning streak in KU's history.  (The streak ended on January 22, 2011 with a loss at home to the Texas Longhorns.)
 On February 25, 2012, the Jayhawks played their final Border War with longtime rival, the Missouri Tigers. The Kansas Jayhawks came back from a 19-point deficit in the second half to take the team to an 87–86 overtime win against the Tigers. The volume level inside the arena was a sustained 120 dB, with a high point of 127 dB when Thomas Robinson blocked Phil Pressey's shot at the end of regulation to preserve the tie.
 On January 4, 2016, the Jayhawks, who were ranked 1st in the AP poll and 2nd in the coaches poll, played Oklahoma, who was ranked 2nd in the AP poll and 1st in the coaches poll. The game was back and forth the last few minutes of regulation. The game eventually went to 3 overtimes, and KU won 109–106. Kansas forward Perry Ellis scored 27 points and got 13 rebounds while Oklahoma guard Buddy Hield scored 46 points. The game was the first time in Big 12 history that a conference game featured the number 1 ranked team and the number 2 ranked team.
 On February 27, 2016, the Jayhawks won their 12th consecutive Big 12 regular season championship with a 67–58 win at home against Texas Tech. Kansas is one regular season conference championship behind UCLA's record of 13 straight.
 On February 24, 2018, the Jayhawks won their 14th consecutive Big 12 regular season championship with a 74–72 win at Texas Tech. With this win, Kansas broke the NCAA record for most consecutive league championships (previously held by UCLA with 13).
 On March 25, 2018, the Jayhawks played Duke in the 2018 NCAA tournament in the Elite Eight. The game featured two of the top college basketball programs in the nation with a Hall of Fame coach on both sidelines with Bill Self and Mike Krzyzewski. The game was a back and forth game that had 18 lead changes and 11 ties. Senior guard Sviatoslav Mykhailiuk made a 3 pointer with 25.7 seconds left to tie the game at 72. Duke guard Grayson Allen missed the potential game winning shot as time expired and the game went into overtime. Kansas guard Malik Newman scored all 13 of the Jayhawks points in overtime to help them win 85–81 earning KU their first Final Four trip since 2012.
 After defeating Providence in the 2022 NCAA tournament, Kansas passed Kentucky to be the winningest program in the nation. 
 When the Jayhawks defeated North Carolina in the 2022 National Championship game, they completed the largest comeback in National Championship game history. They were down by as much as 16 points in the first half and were down 25–40 at halftime and won 72–69.

Coaches
Despite having a program for over 120 years, the Jayhawks have only had 8 head coaches. Four of their coaches have been elected to the Hall of Fame as a coach. The longest tenured coach was Phog Allen at 39 seasons, while the shortest tenured coach was Larry Brown, who coached for 5 seasons. Allen also has the most wins in Kansas basketball history with 590. The next closest coach is current head coach Bill Self, who has won over 500 games. Ted Owens is the only coach in program history to have been fired. Allen and Harp are the only Jayhawk coaches to have also played at the school. Self had his first coaching job as an assistant under Brown at Kansas.

Of programs who have been around for at least 100 years, Kansas has had the fewest coaches, yet they have been led to the Final Four by more coaches than any other program.  Every coach that has coached Kansas since the inception of the NCAA Tournament in 1939 has led the team to a Final Four.  Phog Allen, Dick Harp, Ted Owens, Larry Brown,  Roy Williams, and  Bill Self have all led Kansas to NCAA Final Four appearances. Of those coaches, Allen, Brown, and Bill Self have led the Jayhawks to NCAA Championships (in 1952, 1988, 2008, and 2022 respectively). In addition to an NCAA Tournament National Championship, Allen won two retroactively awarded Helms Athletic Foundation National Championships for the 1922 and 1923 seasons. Allen and Self are the only coaches to win multiple National Championships of any kind, while Self is the only one to win multiple NCAA Tournament National Championships.

While officially only having had eight coaches in program history, the Jayhawks also had three interim coaches who are not considered an official part of the coaching history. In 1919, Karl Schlademan coached, and won, the first game of the season before relinquishing the coaching position to Allen in order to concentrate on his duties as head track coach. In 1947, Howard Engleman coached 14 games (going 8–6) after Allen was ordered to take a rest following the 13th game of the season. Engleman's record is not listed in this table as he was never officially a head coach at the university. Assistant coach Norm Roberts served as acting head coach for the beginning of the 2022–23 season while Bill Self served a 4-game suspension for alleged recruiting violations.

Updated April 5, 2022

Facilities

Snow Hall (1898–1907)
Before 1907 the Jayhawks played in various venues, ranging from the basement of the original Snow Hall (even though the ceiling was only 14 feet high) to the skating rink at the local YMCA. Although a current campus building bears the same name, the original Snow Hall was demolished in 1934.

Robinson Gymnasium (1907–1927)

Robinson Gym was the first athletic building on the KU campus and featured a 2,500-seat auditorium used for basketball purposes. The building was demolished in 1967.

Hoch Auditorium (1927–1955)

Hoch Auditorium was a 3,500 seat multi-purpose arena in Lawrence, Kansas. It opened in 1927. It was home to the University of Kansas Jayhawks basketball teams until Allen Fieldhouse opened in 1955.

Many of Hoch's nicknames during the basketball years were "Horrible Hoch" and "The House of Horrors." Such nicknames were in reference to the difficulty opposing teams had in dealing with the tight area surrounding the court and the curved walls and decorative lattice work directly behind the backboards. The curvature of the walls made the backboards appear to be moving causing opponents to miss free throws.

On June 15, 1991, Hoch Auditorium was struck by lightning. The auditorium and stage area were completely destroyed. Only the limestone facade and lobby area were spared. When reconstruction of the building was complete, the rear half of the building was named Budig Hall, for then KU Chancellor Gene Budig. The name on the facade was altered to reflect the presence of three large auditorium-style lecture halls within the building: Hoch Auditoria.

Allen Fieldhouse (1955–present)

Allen Fieldhouse was dedicated on March 1, 1955 when the Jayhawks defeated in-state rival, Kansas State 77–67.

Since February 20, 1994, the Jayhawks have lost only 14 regular season games in Allen Fieldhouse, a 263–14 record (.951). Since February 3, 2007, the Jayhawks have gone 227–9 (.962) at Allen Fieldhouse, as of April 17, 2021, one of the best home record in all of basketball.

Allen Fieldhouse is also notorious for its noise level as well. On November 4, 2010, ESPN The Magazine named Allen Fieldhouse the loudest college basketball arena in the country, reaching sustained decibel levels over 120. On February 13, 2017 in a game against Big 12 opponent West Virginia, fans at Allen Fieldhouse broke the Guinness World Record for loudest crowd roar at an indoor sporting event with a roar of 130.4 decibels, which had been set by Kentucky on January 28 against Kansas.

In the DeBruce Center at the northeast corner of the building is the original document of the Dr. Naismith's Original 13 Rules Of Basketball, purchased at auction by the Booth family for $4.3 million on December 10, 2010.

Kansas won 69 consecutive games at the Fieldhouse between February 3, 2007 and January 17, 2011 until Texas ended the longest streak in NCAA Division I since 1992 with a 74–63 win against Kansas on January 22, 2011. This streak broke Kansas' previous school record of 62, which lasted from February 26, 1994 through December 18, 1998 (during which time, the Jayhawks, along with the remaining members of the Big Eight Conference merged with the remaining members of the Southwest Conference to become charter members of the Big 12 Conference). The Jayhawks also completed a 55-game streak between February 22, 1984 through January 30, 1988, which is a Big 8 record.

Home game traditions
Before the start of every Jayhawks home game, after the singing of "The Star-Spangled Banner", it is a tradition to sing the alma mater, "Crimson and the Blue". While singing the alma mater, it is tradition for the students in attendance to put an arm over the shoulders of their neighbors and slowly sway side to side, lifting their arms over their heads as the last line of the song is sung. The song is concluded by the Rock Chalk Chant.

Post-game, the band will play a rendition of the Kansas state song "Home on the Range", which the crowd will stand up for similar to the national anthem.

After singing The Star-Spangled Banner, while the opposing team is being introduced, members of the student section take out a copy of the student-run newspaper, The University Daily Kansan, and wave the paper in front of their faces, pretending to be reading it in an effort to show lack of interest in the opposing team. After the opponents are introduced, a short video is shown, detailing the history and the accomplishments of Kansas basketball. As the Jayhawks are introduced, the students rip up their newspapers and throw the confetti pieces of paper in the air as celebration. Whatever confetti remains is typically thrown in the air after the first basket made by the Jayhawks.

If an opposing player fouls out of the game, the fans will "wave the wheat", waving their arms back and forth, as a sarcastic good-bye to the disqualified player, to the tune of "You Didn't Have Your Wheaties", from a series of 1970s television commercials promoting Wheaties breakfast cereal. The same waving motion to the tune of "A Hot Time in the Old Town" follows a Jayhawk victory.

If the Jayhawks are leading comfortably near the end of the game, the crowd begins a slow version of the Rock Chalk Chant, which has become the signature tradition of Allen Fieldhouse. The chant can also occasionally be heard at neutral sites, such as arenas for the NCAA tournament and the nearby T-Mobile Center on the Missouri side of Kansas City which during the regular season serves as an alternate home arena.

Fans and students will also line up early for Late Night In The Phog, which is the first practice of the season. The practice is viewable to the public and includes skits with past players as the hosts.

Year-by-year Results

Rivalries

Kansas State

The Jayhawks longest played rivalry is with cross-state rival Kansas State. The Jayhawks lead the series 203–94. The Jayhawks have dominated the series since 1984 holding a record of 86–12 in that time frame. K-State has not led the all-time series since 1922. The schools have met annually since 1912 and first played in 1907. Kansas leads in Lawrence 93-35, in Manhattan 81-48, and on neutral courts 29-11. The Largest K-State victory was by 27 points, 96-69, on January 20, 1979. The largest Kansas win was 45 points, 90–45, on March 10, 1955. K-State longest win streak was 5 games, which they achieved twice, from 1972–74 and 1982–83. The longest winning streak from Kansas was 31 games from 1994–2005.

Missouri

The Jayhawks main rival has been Missouri for many years. The two teams first played in 1907. The two teams played every year until Missouri left the Big 12 for the SEC. The schools renewed the rivalry beginning in the 2021-22 season. The Jayhawks won the first game in the renewal of the rivalry 102–65. KU leads the all-time series 174–94. The Jayhawks largest victory was 47 points, 96–49, on December 28, 1977. Missouri's largest victory was 30 points, 99–69, on January 17, 1976. The Jayhawks longest winning streak was 14 games from 1910–1913. Missouri's longest winning streak was 9 from 1920–22.

Wichita State
While not officially a rivalry, the Jayhawks have played cross-state opponent Wichita State 15 times. The teams most recently met in the 2015 NCAA tournament in the round of 32. Wichita State won that game 79–65. The teams haven't met in the regular season since KU defeated Wichita State 103–54 on January 6, 1993. Kansas leads the all-time series 12–3. The Jayhawks largest victory was the aforementioned 49 point victory in 1993. The Shockers largest victory was the 14-point victory in the 2015 NCAA Tournament mentioned already. Wichita State has never won consecutive games against Kansas. The Jayhawks won five times in a row from 1989–93. Wichita State won both games between the schools in the NCAA Tournament.

Post-season results

Regular season conference championships
The Jayhawks have won 63 conference championships since their inception, including an NCAA record 14 consecutive from 2005 through 2018. The Jayhawks have belonged to the Big 12 Conference since it formed before the 1996–97 season. Before that, the Jayhawks have belonged to the Missouri Valley Intercollegiate Athletic Association from the 1907–08 to 1927–28 seasons, the Big Six Conference from 1928–29 to 1946–47, the Big Seven Conference from 1947–48 to 1957–58, the Big Eight Conference from 1958 to 1959 up until the end of the 1995–96 season. The Big Six and Big Seven conferences were actually the more often used names of the Missouri Valley Intercollegiate Athletic Association, which existed under that official name until 1964, when it was changed to the Big Eight.

Missouri Valley Intercollegiate Athletic Association (13)
 1908, 1909, 1910, 1911, 1912, 1914, 1915, 1922, 1923, 1924, 1925, 1926, 1927

Big 6/7/8 Conference (30)
 1931, 1932, 1933, 1934, 1936, 1937, 1938, 1940, 1941, 1942, 1943, 1946, 1950, 1952, 1953, 1954, 1957, 1960, 1966, 1967, 1971, 1974, 1975, 1978, 1986, 1991, 1992, 1993, 1995, 1996

Big 12 Conference (20)
 1997, 1998, 2002, 2003, 2005, 2006, 2007, 2008, 2009, 2010, 2011, 2012, 2013, 2014, 2015, 2016, 2017, 2018, 2020, 2022

Conference tournament championships
The Big Eight Conference did not regularly have a post-season tournament until after the 1977 season. Prior to that teams usually played in the Big Eight (before that, Big Seven) Holiday Tournament in December. The Holiday tournament ended after the 1979 season.

Big Seven/Big Eight Holiday Tournament (13)
 1951, 1953, 1956, 1957, 1962, 1964, 1965, 1966, 1968, 1970, 1974, 1977, 1978

Big Eight Conference (4)
 1981, 1984, 1986, 1992

Big 12 Conference (12)
 1997, 1998, 1999, 2006, 2007, 2008, 2010, 2011, 2013, 2016, 2018, 2022

NCAA Tournament seeding history
The NCAA started seeding teams with the 1978 tournament, with the seeding format used today beginning in 1979. The Jayhawks were seeded for the first time in their 1981 tournament appearance. There was no tournament in 2020 due to the COVID-19 pandemic.

* Indicates overall number one seed. 
Indicates NCAA championship.

Final Four history
 1940-Runner-up
1952-Champion
 1953-Runner-up
 1957-Runner-up
 1971-Semifinalist
 1974-Semifinalist
 1986-Semifinalist
1988-Champion
 1991-Runner-up
 1993-Semifinalist
 2002-Semifinalist
 2003-Runner-up
2008-Champion
 2012-Runner-up
 2018-Semifinalist
2022-Champion

Men's NCAA Tournament Most Outstanding Player
 1952 – Clyde Lovellette
 1953 – B. H. Born*
 1957 – Wilt Chamberlain*
 1988 – Danny Manning
 2008 – Mario Chalmers
 2022 – Ochai Agbaji

National Championships
The Jayhawks have been awarded a combined 6 National Championships, two Helms National Championships and four NCAA Tournament National Championships. The Helms titles were awarded retroactively by the Helms Athletic Foundation in 1943. Some schools do not claim Helms championships, Kansas, however, does claim them and has a banner hanging for both in Allen Fieldhouse, along with their NCAA Tournament championships.

Helms Athletic Foundation Championships
 1921-22
Head Coach: Phog Allen
Record: 16-2

 1922-23
Head Coach: Phog Allen
Record: 17-1

NCAA Tournament National Championships

1952

The Jayhawks 1951-52 team won the schools first NCAA Tournament Championship. They were coached by Phog Allen and finished the season with a 28–3 record.

1988

The 1987-88 team won the Jayhawks second NCAA Tournament championship. The Jayhawks were coached by Larry Brown. They finished the season 27–11, which is the lowest winning percentage (.710) and most losses of any team to win the national championship. The team remains the only championship team of the Jayhawks that did not win the regular season conference championship or the conference tournament championship.

2008

The 2007-08 team won the Jayhawks third NCAA Tournament Championship. They were coached by Bill Self and finished the season with a 37–3 record, which is a school record for wins in a season.

2022

The 2021-22 team won the Jayhawks fourth NCAA Tournament Championship, which is their most recent championship. They were coached by Bill Self and finished the season with a 34–6 record. The Jayhawks tournament run in 2022 is the only one since teams began being seeded that they did not play a single number 1 seed in the Final Four and National Championship game.

Complete NCAA tournament results
The Jayhawks have appeared in the NCAA tournament 51 times. Their combined record is 115–48. Their largest victory in a tournament game was a 58-point (110–52) victory over Prairie View A&M in 1998, which is also the Jayhawks tournament record for most points scored in a tournament game. Their largest defeat in a tournament game was a 34-point defeat (51–85) against USC in 2021, which was also their lowest point in the NCAA tournament total since the introduction of the shot clock in the 1985–86 season. They have been eliminated in the first round only six times since the beginning of the tournament, only two of those times have been since the tournament expanded to 64 teams. The Jayhawks have played in 11 overtime games in the NCAA Tournament and have a 6–5 record. Two of their overtime games went into multiple overtimes, those was their 3 overtime game against North Carolina in the 1957 National Championship game and their double overtime loss to Texas Western in the 1966 Elite Eight. The loss to Texas Western was featured in the 2006 film Glory Road.

Only four times in program history has Kansas failed to win a single game in the tournament and only twice since the tournament expanded to 64 teams in 1985.

Appearances are grouped by the number of teams in the bracket. Round names are based on what round names were at the time of the tournament, not the present names. The term "Elite eight" began in 1956, "Final four" began in 1975, and "Sweet Sixteen" began in 1988.

Eight team tournament

Sixteen to Thirty-two team tournament

Fourty to Fifty-three teams

Sixty-four teams

Sixty-five teams

First four era

*Following the introduction of the First Four round in 2011, the Round of 64 and Round of 32 were referred to as the Second Round and Third Round, respectively, from 2011 to 2015, then from 2016 moving forward, the Round 64 and Round of 32 will be called the First and Second rounds.

Record by round

NIT results
The Jayhawks have appeared in the National Invitation Tournament (NIT) two times. Their combined record is 3–2.

Jayhawks of note

All-time scoring leaders

All-Americans

Consensus first team
Kansas leads all NCAA teams with 31 consensus First Team All-American selections, 24 different players have received the honor.

 1909– Tommy Johnson, forward
 1915– Ralph Sproull, forward
 1919– Dutch Lonborg, guard
 1922– Paul Endacott, guard
 1923– Paul Endacott, guard
 1923– Charlie T. Black, guard
 1924– Charlie T. Black, guard
 1924– Tusten Ackerman, center
 1925– Tusten Ackerman, center
 1926– Gale Gordon, guard
 1926– Al Peterson, center
 1938– Fred Pralle, guard
 1941– Howard Engleman, forward
 1943– Charles B. Black, forward
 1951– Clyde Lovellette, center
 1952– Clyde Lovellette, center
 1957– Wilt Chamberlain, center
 1958– Wilt Chamberlain, center
 1987– Danny Manning, forward
 1988– Danny Manning, forward‡
 1997– Raef LaFrentz, forward
 1998– Raef LaFrentz, forward‡
 1998– Paul Pierce, forward
 2002– Drew Gooden, forward
 2003– Nick Collison, forward‡
 2005– Wayne Simien, forward
 2010– Sherron Collins, guard
 2012– Thomas Robinson, forward
 2017– Frank Mason III, guard
 2018– Devonte' Graham, guard
 2022– Ochai Agbaji, guard

‡ indicates player has made at least 2000 points and 1000 rebounds in his college career.

Other first team selections

 1925– Gale Gordon, guard
 1925– Al Peterson, center
 1930– Forrest Cox, guard
 1932– Ted O'Leary, forward
 1933– Bill Johnson, center
 1936– Ray Ebling- forward
 1937– Fred Pralle, guard
 1942– Charles B. Black, forward
 1942– Ray Evans, guard
 1943– Ray Evans, guard
 1946– Charles B. Black, forward
 1947– Charles B. Black, forward
 1950– Clyde Lovellette, center
 1953– B. H. Born, center
 1961– Bill Bridges, forward
 1962– Jerry Gardner, guard
 1965– Walt Wesley, center
 1966– Walt Wesley, center
 1968– Jo Jo White, guard
 1969– Jo Jo White, guard
 1970– Dave Robisch, forward
 1971– Dave Robisch, forward
 1972– Bud Stallworth, forward
 1981– Darnell Valentine, guard
 1986– Danny Manning, forward
 2020– Udoka Azubuike, center

Academic All-Americans
 1971 – Bud Stallworth
 1974 – Tom Kivisto
 1977 – Cris Barnthouse & Ken Koenigs
 1978 – Ken Koenigs
 1979 – Darnell Valentine
 1980 – Darnell Valentine
 1981 – Darnell Valentine
 1982 – David Magley
 1996 – Jacque Vaughn
 1997 – Jacque Vaughn† & Jerod Haase
 1999 – Ryan Robertson
 2010 – Cole Aldrich†
 2011 – Tyrel Reed

† indicates Academic All-American of the Year

National Player of the Year awards
 1923 – Paul Endacott (Helms Foundation)
 1924 – Charlie T. Black (Helms Foundation)
 1952 – Clyde Lovellette (Helms Foundation)
 1988 – Danny Manning (Wooden, NABC, Naismith)
 2002 – Drew Gooden (NABC)
 2003 – Nick Collison (NABC)
 2017 – Frank Mason III (Consensus)

McDonald's All-Americans
The 49 McDonald's All-Americans listed below have played for Kansas. An asterisk, "*", Indicates player did not finish his college career at Kansas. A cross, "†", indicates player did not begin his college career at Kansas. The 2015 game had the most future Jayhawks playing in the game with four, however, two players transferred to Kansas and one transferred out of Kansas.

1970–1999

 1977 – Darnell Valentine
 1978 – Tony Guy
 1979 – Ricky Ross*
 1981 – Greg Dreiling†
 1982 – Kerry Boagni*
 1984 – Danny Manning
 1985 – Rick Calloway†
 1986 – Mark Randall
 1987 – Mike Maddox
 1990 – Darrin Hancock†
 1991 – Calvin Rayford & Ben Davis*
 1993 – Jacque Vaughn
 1994 – Raef LaFrentz
 1995 – Ryan Robertson & Paul Pierce
 1996 – Lester Earl†
 1997 – Kenny Gregory & Eric Chenowith
 1998 – Jeff Boschee
 1999 – Nick Collison

2000–2019

 2001 – Wayne Simien & Aaron Miles
 2003 – J. R. Giddens* & David Padgett*
 2005 – Micah Downs*, Mario Chalmers & Julian Wright
 2006 – Sherron Collins & Darrell Arthur
 2007 – Cole Aldrich
 2009 – Xavier Henry
 2010 – Josh Selby
 2012 – Perry Ellis
 2013 – Wayne Selden, Jr. & Andrew Wiggins
 2014 – Cliff Alexander & Kelly Oubre
 2015 – Carlton Bragg*, Cheick Diallo, Malik Newman† & Dedric Lawson† 
 2016 – Udoka Azubuike & Josh Jackson
 2018 – David McCormack, Quentin Grimes* & Devon Dotson

2020–present 
 2020 – Bryce Thompson*
 2022 – Gradey Dick, M. J. Rice, Ernest Udeh
 2023 – Elmarko Jackson

Jayhawk basketball players notable in other fields
Below are any former Jayhawks who are notable in other fields. Included are the years they played basketball at Kansas and what they are notable for.

 Jim Bausch – Olympic decathlete – 1929–1931 – also a member of the College Football Hall of Fame
 Bob Dole – Politician – 1941–1944 – also played football while at Kansas
 Walter Sutton – Geneticist – 1898–1899

Retired jerseys 
KU only retires the jerseys, and not the numbers, of past basketball players. Eight players honored played on one of KU's 5 championship teams. Thirty-one players have had their jersey retired by Kansas. One former announcer, Max Falkenstien, is honored with the retired jerseys as well. His number 60 was chosen because that was the number of years he was the radio announcer for the Jayhawks. Charlie T. Black and Paul Endacott are the only two players with their jerseys retired to play on two championship teams. Four players from the 2008 Championship have their jersey retired, which is the most players honored to be on a roster in any single season in Kansas basketball history.

Notes

  Member of 1922 National Championship team
  Member of 1923 National Championship team
  Member of 1952 National Championship team
  Member of 1988 National Championship team
  Member of 2008 National Championship team

Jayhawks in the Naismith Memorial Basketball Hall of Fame
There are multiple former Kansas players that have been enshrined in the Naismith Memorial Basketball Hall of Fame. Some former players have been enshrined as players, while some former players have been enshrined as coaches.

Players
 Wilt Chamberlain
 Paul Endacott
 Bill Johnson
 Allen Kelley (enshrined as member of 1960 Olympic gold medal team)
 Clyde Lovellette
 Paul Pierce
 Jo Jo White

Jayhawk Coaches
Below are Jayhawk head coaches in the Hall of Fame.

 Phog Allen (also a former player)
 Larry Brown
 Roy Williams
 Bill Self (also a former assistant coach)

Former players not enshrined as a player or Kansas coach
The following former players are enshrined in the Hall of Fame but not as a player or as a coach at Kansas.

 John Bunn, also freshmen team coach, enshrined as a contributor
 Dutch Lonborg, former athletic director, enshrined as a coach
 Ralph Miller, also a Kansas football player, enshrined as a coach
 Ernie Quigley, enshrined as a referee
 Adolph Rupp, enshrined as a coach
 Dean Smith, enshrined as a coach

Others
The following are people associated with Kansas basketball in some way that are in the Hall of Fame for a reason not already mentioned.

 James Naismith, head coach from 1898–1907, enshrined as inventor of the game, namesake for Hall of Fame
 John Calipari, assistant at Kansas from 1982–1985, enshrined as a head coach, primarily a college coach but had a brief stint in the NBA.

Jayhawks in the National Collegiate Basketball Hall of Fame
There are multiple former Kansas players that have been enshrined in the National Collegiate Basketball Hall of Fame. Some former players have been enshrined as players, while some former players have been enshrined as coaches.

Coaches
 Phog Allen, also a former player
 Larry Brown
 Roy Williams

Players
 Wilt Chamberlain
 Paul Endacott
 Bill Johnson
 Clyde Lovellette
 Danny Manning
 Paul Pierce

Former players inducted as coaches
 Dean Smith, coached at North Carolina
 Adolph Rupp, coached at Kentucky
 Ralph Miller, coached at Wichita (now known as Wichita State), Iowa, and Oregon State
 Dutch Lonborg, coached at McPherson, Washburn, and Northwestern

Contributors
 James Naismith, former coach, inducted as inventor of basketball
 John Bunn, former basketball and football player, inducted as chairman of Naismith Memorial Basketball Hall of Fame

Olympians
Below are Jayhawks who represented their country in the Olympic Games as a player or coach. Thirteen Jayhawks have been chosen to represent their home country in the Olympics. Only Sasha Kaun represented a country other than the United States when he represented Russia in 2012. Kaun is the most recent Jayhawk to play in the olympics, while Danny Manning is the most recent Jayhawk to represent the United States. Ten played in the Olympics, two coached, and one was selected but didn't play due to a boycott, Darnell Valentine. The 1952 Olympic team featured 7 Jayhawk players and a coach. Two former Jayhawk basketball players have coached in the Olympics.

Presidential Medal of Freedom
The Presidential Medal of Freedom is the highest civilian honor in the United States and is awarded by the president. Two Jayhawk basketball players have received this honor, former North Carolina head coach Dean Smith, who played guard at Kansas from 1949–1953. Barack Obama gave him the award in 2013. Politician Bob Dole, who played basketball at Kansas in the 1941–42 season and played football at the school as well, received the award from Bill Clinton in 1997.

Jayhawks in the NBA
The Jayhawks have multiple connections to the NBA. Below is a list of former players and coaches. People that are currently coaches or in management will show their current job, as well as how they are associated with Kansas basketball.

Current management
 R. C. Buford – General Manager San Antonio Spurs, assistant coach 1983–1988
 Kevin Pritchard – President of basketball operations Indiana Pacers, player 1986–1990
 Nick Collison – Special assistant to general manager Oklahoma City Thunder, player 1999–2003

Coaches
 Alvin Gentry – Head Coach, New Orleans Pelicans, assistant coach, 1986–89
 Gregg Popovich – Head Coach, San Antonio Spurs, volunteer assistant 1986–87 season
 Jacque Vaughn – Head coach, Brooklyn Nets, played at Kansas 1993–97
 Michael Lee, Golden State Warriors, professional scout, played at Kansas 2001–05
 Terry Nooner – Assistant coach, Cleveland Cavaliers, played at Kansas 1996–2000
 Aaron Miles – Assistant coach, Boston Celtics, played at Kansas 2001–05
 Rex Walters – Assistant coach, New Orleans Pelicans, played at Kansas 1991–93

Current players
Below is a list of former Jayhawk basketball on NBA rosters. Free agents should not be included on the list. Players with an asterisk are players that have been assigned to the G-League. In the offseason, players who were signed to a team's summer league roster should not be included.

 Ochai Agbaji – Utah Jazz
 Udoka Azubuike – Utah Jazz*
 Christian Braun – Denver Nuggets
 Joel Embiid — Philadelphia 76ers
 Devonte' Graham – San Antonio Spurs
 Marcus Morris – Los Angeles Clippers 
 Markieff Morris – Dallas Mavericks
 Sviatoslav Mykhailiuk – Charlotte Hornets
 Kelly Oubre Jr. – Charlotte Hornets

 Andrew Wiggins — Golden State Warriors

Recently became a Free agent
This section is former Jayhawks that were on an NBA roster during the 2019-2020 NBA season but are not on an NBA roster. Any players on this list that are not on a roster by the start of the season should be moved to former players. Players listed below may be under contract in an international league, but are not under contract in the NBA or the G-League.

 Wayne Selden, most recently played for the New York Knicks
 Josh Jackson, most recently played for the Sacramento Kings

Former players
Below are former Jayhawks who spent three or more seasons in the NBA.

 Cole Aldrich (2010–18)
 Darrell Arthur (2008–18)
 Charles B. Black (1948–51)
 Tarik Black (2014–18)
 Bill Bridges (1962–74)
 Walter Roger Brown (1972–79)
 Wilt Chamberlain (1959–72)
 Nick Collison (2003–18)

 Greg Dreiling (1986–96)
 Drew Gooden (2002–16)
 Xavier Henry (2010–14)
 Wayne Hightower (1962–71)
 Kirk Hinrich (2003–16)
 Maury King (1959–62)
 Raef LaFrentz (1998–09)
 Clyde Lovellette (1953–63)

 Danny Manning (1988–02)
 Frank Mason III (2017–21)
 Paul Mokeski (1979–90)
 Greg Ostertag (1995–05)
 Paul Pierce (1998–17)
 Scot Pollard (1997–08)
 Kevin Pritchard (1990–95)
 Mark Randall (1991–94)

 Dave Robisch (1971–83)
 Thomas Robinson (2012–17)
 Brandon Rush (2008–17)
 Isaac Stallworth (1972–76)
 Billy Thomas (1999–08)
 Calvin Thompson (1983–86)
 Darnell Valentine (1981–90)
 Jacque Vaughn (1997–09)

 Rex Walters (1993–99)
 Walt Wesley (1966–75)
 Jo Jo White (1969–80)
 Jeff Withey (2013–17)
 Julian Wright (2007–11)

Draft history
 89 total NBA draft picks.
 40 players drafted 30th or better. 37 if including territorial pick Wilt Chamberlain. (Equivalent to 1st round picks by modern draft standards.)
 22 players drafted 31–60th. (Equivalent to 2nd round picks by modern draft standards.)

Territorial Picks
From 1947 to 1965 the draft allowed teams not drawing fans to select a local player, in place of their first round pick.

Regular Draft

NBA Award winners
Below are Jayhawks that have won an award in the NBA such as MVP, Rookie of the Year, etc. Not included are Jayhawks who made All-Star or All-NBA teams, or Jayhawks that have won All-Star game MVP, the dunk contest, or 3 point contest. Ten times a Jayhawk has won a major award, five different Jayhawks have won awards. The only major award a Jayhawk has never won is Defensive Player of the Year. Wilt Chamberlain won an award six times during his career including four MVP Awards.

Current Jayhawk college coaches
Division I Head Coaches – former players
 Tad Boyle, Colorado

Division I Head Coaches – former players and assistant coaches
 Jerod Haase, Stanford

Division I assistants – former players
 Jeremy Case, Kansas
 Danny Manning, Louisville
 Evan Manning, Gonzaga

Jayhawks in the NBA G-League

Players
Below are former Jayhawks under contract with a G-League team but are not on a two-way contract with an NBA team.
 Tarik Black – Grand Rapids Gold
 Mario Chalmers – Sioux Falls Skyforce
 Cheick Diallo – Motor City Cruise
 Devon Dotson – Windy City Bulls
 Marcus Garrett – Sioux Falls Skyforce
 Frank Mason III – South Bay Lakers
 Malik Newman – Cleveland Charge

Management
 Tyler Self – Austin Spurs General Manager

NCAA records

Active streaks
 20+ win seasons: 32, since 1990
 Consecutive NCAA Tournament appearances: 31, since 1990*
 Most consecutive coaches leading team to Final Four: 6

Team
 Largest unranked-to-ranked jump: From unranked to No. 4 after beating No. 1 (UNLV), No. 2 (LSU), and No. 25 (SJU) in the 1989 preseason NIT.
 Most wins over an opponent in a single calendar year: 5 (Over Nebraska in 1909 and Kansas State in 1935)
 Consecutive regular season conference championships: 14, 2005 to 2018
 Consecutive weeks ranked in AP poll: 231, February 2, 2009 to February 8, 2021
 25+ win seasons: 15, 2005–06 season to 2019–20 season

Individual
 Career games scoring in double figures: 132, Danny Manning
 Rebounds in first career game: 31, Wilt Chamberlain, vs. Northwestern, December 5, 1956
 Most blocks in a single NCAA tournament: 31, Jeff Withey

Other
 Most winning seasons: 101
 Most non-losing seasons (.500 or better): 104
 Most regular season conference championships: 61
 Most Consensus first-team All-Americans: 23
 Most Consensus first-team All-American selections: 30

See also
 NCAA Men's Division I Final Four appearances by coaches
 NCAA Men's Division I Final Four appearances by school
 List of teams with the most victories in NCAA Division I men's college basketball
 NCAA Men's Division I Basketball Tournament Consecutive Appearances

References

External links
 

 
Basketball teams established in 1898
1898 establishments in Kansas